Gunnar Helland may refer to:

 Gunnar Gunnarsson Helland (1889–1976), Norwegian-American Hardanger fiddle maker
 Gunnar Olavsson Helland (1852–1938), Norwegian Hardanger fiddle maker